Sienkiewicz is a Polish form of the Belarusian surname Siankievič. Russian equivalent: Senkevich.

Notable people with the surname include:

 Agnieszka Sienkiewicz (born 1984), Polish actress
 Bartłomiej Sienkiewicz (born 1961), Polish politician
 Bill Sienkiewicz (born 1958), American artist
 Henryk Sienkiewicz (1846–1916), Polish journalist and writer
 Ruth Sienkiewicz-Mercer (1950-1998), American activist

See also
Sinkiewicz

References

Polish-language surnames